Georgy Aleksandrovich Evseev (born 28 May 1962) is a Russian chess problemist.

Career
Evseev won four times the Soviet Union Chess Solving Championship (1982, 1984, 1986, 1989). He is the first chess player to win three times in a row the individual World Chess Solving Championship: 1989, 1990 and 1991. In 1998 he repeated the success for the fourth time. In 1991 Evseev gained the title of International Solving Grandmaster. In 2014 he convincingly won the Russia Chess Solving Championship. In 2015 Evseev won the European Chess Solving Championship in Iași, Romania. As of January 2016, he is the leader of the WFCC solvers’ ranking.

References

External links
Georgy Evseev  chess games and profile at Chess-DB.com
 problems at the Chess Problem Database Server

1962 births
Living people
Chess composers
International solving grandmasters
Russian chess players
Soviet chess players
Sportspeople from Moscow